David Muradovich Tkebuchava (born 17 January 1991) is a former Russian football midfielder of Georgian descent.

Club career
He made his debut in the Russian Football National League for  FC Baltika Kaliningrad on 13 August 2012 in a game against FC Sibir Novosibirsk.

References

External links
 
 

1991 births
Russian sportspeople of Georgian descent
Living people
Russian footballers
Association football midfielders
FC Rostov players
FC Baltika Kaliningrad players